John Richard Cockwell  (born 1939) is a British-born Falkland Islands politician who served as a Member of the Legislative Council for the Camp constituency from 1997 until 2001, and then as a member for the Stanley constituency from 2001 until 2009.

Cockwell grew up in Hampshire and attended Stanbridge Earls. He briefly worked as a shepherd on Salisbury Plain before moving to Australia. He moved to the Falkland Islands in 1964 to work at Packe Brothers and Co limited in Fox Bay, becoming the company's Manager in 1967.

He was elected to the Legislative Council at the 1997 general election for the Camp constituency and re-elected four years later as a member for Stanley. He didn't seek re-election in 2009.

References

1939 births
Living people
English emigrants to Australia
English emigrants to the Falkland Islands
Falkland Islands farmers
Falkland Islands Councillors 1997–2001
Falkland Islands Councillors 2001–2005
Falkland Islands Councillors 2005–2009
Officers of the Order of the British Empire